Solbergfjorden is a fjord (or more accurately, a strait) on the southeastern side of the large island of Senja in Troms og Finnmark county, Norway. It lies in the municipalities of Dyrøy, Sørreisa, and Senja. Vangsvik is one of the larger settlements along the Solbergfjorden.

See also
 List of Norwegian fjords

References

Fjords of Troms og Finnmark
Dyrøy
Sørreisa
Senja